MasterChef Thailand All-Stars is a cooking game show, spun off from MasterChef Thailand. It originally aired on February 2, 2020 on Channel 7, with contestants from previous seasons competing. Hosted by Piyathida Mitr Theerote and the committee is ML Pasan Sawat Dewat, ML Kwanthip Devakula and Pongthawat Chalerm Kittichai

Contestants

Elimination table

 (WINNER) This cook won the competition.
 (RUNNER-UP) This cook finished in second place.
 (WIN) The cook won an individual challenge (Mystery box challenge or Invention Test).
 (WIN) The cook was on the winning in the Between two persons challenge.
 (WIN) The cook was on the winning team in the "Team challenge" and directly advanced to the next round.
 (HIGH) The cook was one of the top entries in an individual challenge, but didn't win.
 (IN) The cook wasn't selected as a top or bottom entry in an individual challenge.
 (IN) The cook wasn't selected as a top or bottom entry in a Team challenge but are safe and did not compete in the Pressure Test.
 (IMM) The cook didn't have to compete in that round of the competition and was safe from elimination.
 (PT) The cook was on the losing team in the Team challenge and competed in the Pressure test.
 (PT) The cook didn't have to compete in the Team challenge but competed in the Pressure test.
 (LOSE) The cook loses in the Between two persons challenge .
 (LOW) The cook was one of the bottom entries in an individual challenge, but wasn't the last person to advance.
 (LOW) The cook was one of the bottom entries in an individual challenge, and the last person to advance.
 (WDR) The cook withdrew due to illness or personal reason.
 (ELIM) The cook was eliminated from MasterChef.
 (JOIN) The cook was originally eliminated but invited back in the competition for a "Team challenge".

Episodes

Episode 1
 Original airdate: Sunday 2 February 2020

Winner will be next round, loser will be eliminated.
 Time: 60 min (1 hour)

 Guest: Cassia Samphanthawat, Somsak Rarong Kham, Booncheid Sonsuwan, Paweenuch Yodpreechawijit
The game changed. Losers and winners were divided into two teams for the next team challenge next week.

Episode 2
 Original airdate: Sunday 9 February 2020

 Team Challenge 1:  Cook fine-dining dish order from 38 Masterchef Junior contestants 
Location: Masterchef kitchen
This week's teams has been assigned in the last episode, which were the winners and the losers. Each team gets to choose their own team captain. The winners (blue) team chose Jah as their team captain, while the other (red) team chose Lisa.

The judges for this team challenge are MasterChef Junior contestants. The judges get to choose six signature dish they would like, including three appetizers and three main courses. Each team will be getting different amount of each signature dish depending on what dishes each judge want.

 Time: 30 min for appetizers (+10 extra min. for the winner team), and 60 min for main dishes (which blue team got 10 minute time out for bad quality on appetizers.)
 Winner : Red team

 Pressure Test 1:  Making Vietnamese stuffed crispy omelet (Thai-Royal style)

Original: The batter needs to be crispy when served, and in shaped. The shrimp and pork also have to be flavored itself and colors. The bean sprout and shredded coconut have to be cooked with nice scent, and the cucumber salad needs to be sweet, salty and sour like normal.
 Time: 35 min (from 45 min. in season 2.)
 Bottom three: None, since Nick withdrew from the competition.
 Withdrew: Nick

Episode 3
 Original airdate: Sunday 16 February 2020

 Mystery Box 1: Cook pasta dish by using only one pan
 Time: 60 min. (1 hour)
 Three best dishes: Quest, Ploy and Golf
 Winner: Ploy

 Invention Test 1: Cook a 5- star dish from "ginger"

Since Ploy wins the last challenge, she deserve a chance to take control of 9 people she would like to get rid of in the competition. Ploy said that the first 4 people are the group that are her competitor, which include Quest, Toei, Jah and Lisa. Another five, she states, is a group that is not her close friends. In this group, Ploy chose Ball, Pond, Gino, Golf and Chanon. For the rest that did not get called may immune to the next round.
 Time: 60 min. (1 hour)

Overall, Quest did the best, Lisa in second.
 Winner: Quest
 Bottom four: Toei, Chanon, Golf and Ball
 Eliminated: Ball

Episode 4
 Original airdate: Sunday 23 February 2020

 Team Challenge 2:  Cook main dish and desert for 201 truck drivers from "tubtim siam pomelo"
Location: Talad Thai
For this week's team challenge at Talad Thai, all contestants get to choose whether they would like to join Quest's team or Lisa's team. As a result, 11 people chose Lisa and 5 people chose Quest. Meaning, three extra people that Lisa choose needs to join the other team. She chose Belle, Jumlong and Chanon.

 Time: 90 min. (1 hour and 30 min.) for preparation, 60 min (1 hour) for serving.
Winner: Blue team

 Pressure Test 2:  Making family eggs

Round one: Poached eggs (3)  * Time: 10 min.

Original: The egg needs to be beautifully shaped, and the yolk needs to be lava without having the white undercooked.
Qualified: Lat, Pond and Lisa
Round two: Fried eggs (3)  * Time: 7 min.

Original: The white needs to be crispy, while the yolk still raw.
Qualified: Bank, Deaw and Toei
Last three: Tum, Ploy and Kapom
Round three: Omu rice (1)  * Time: 5 min.

Original: The egg needs to be shaped like rugby. When sliced in half, the inside needs to be only half cooked, while the whole cover is perfectly cooked.
Eliminated: Kapom

Episode 5
 Original airdate: Sunday 1 March 2020
Mystery Box 2: Making a new looking jellies
Time: 60 min. (1 hour)
Three best dishes: Ploy, Jah and Lat
Winner: Lat
Invention Test 2: Making six- layer cake (from four in Season 1)

Before this competition starts, Lat can choose two people to qualify with her. She chose Jah and Ploy, because they both are one of the three best dishes that shows everyone their skills to qualify to next round.
Time: 2 hours (120 min.)
But before it's time for judges to taste, Lat have another chance to choose two more people to qualify to next round. She chose Deaw and Bank, since their cake were one of the cakes that got a bit destroyed. After the taste, Lisa did the best, Lukkate in second.
Winner: Lisa
Eliminated: Belle

Episode 6
 Original airdate: Sunday 8 March 2020
 Team Challenge 3:  Cook appetizer, soup and main dish for 71 broadcasters across Thailand.
Location: Asiatique Thailand
Since Bank had a health problem, he had to complete his Pressure Test without doing Team Challenge. 

 Time: 90 min. (1 hour and 30 min.) for appetizers and soup, 60 min. (1 hour) for main dish.

As a result, Red team won blue team with the score of 44 to 27.
 Winner: Red team

 Pressure Test 3:  Making stuffed-fried chicken

What they want: The chicken needs to be in shaped and well cooked. Also, the stuffing needs to be completely filled with no air in the chicken, and the taste has to be like original. In this challenge, they need to do 5 wings, 5 drumsticks.
 Time: 50 min.
Golf and Tum were the bottom two, because two of their drumsticks were undercooked (raw).
 Bottom two: Golf and Tum
 Eliminated: Tum

Episode 7: MasterChef Survival
 Original airdate: Sunday 15 March 2020
 This week is "Masterchef Survival" week, meaning that there will be two people eliminated from the competition, one from each round.
 Mystery Box 3:  Main ingredients: Seafood + Grains
 Time: 60 min. (1 hour)
 Two best dishes: Ploy and Paope
 Winner: Paope
 Bottom two: Toei and Lukkate
 Eliminated: Lukkate
 Invention Test 3:  Cook a fine-dining dish from "insects"
 Time: 60 min (1 hour)
 Winner: Deaw
 Bottom three: Lat, Toei and Jumlong
 Eliminated: Jumlong

Episode 8
 Original airdate: Sunday 22 March 2020

 Team Challenge 4:  Cooking plates of "Big Breakfast"
 For this week's team challenge, they have separated into three teams by Deaw, which saved for the week.
 Location: Masterchef kitchen

Time: 45 min.

When the judges check the overall of all dishes, blue team won the rest with 13 dishes total. But since both red and green team got 11 confirmed dishes, the judges need to check the quality of each dishes. As a result, red team won green team for quality.
 Winner: Blue team
 Team that is going to Pressure Test: Green team

 Pressure Test 4:  Making "Belle Helene"

What the judges want: The steak needs to be medium rare, but without using oven. Also, the potato stick needs to be crispy and all have to have equal sides and lengths. Finally, the sauce needs to taste like the original.
 Guest: Chef Pruek Cassia Samphanthawat
 Time: 30 min.
 Winner: Pond
 Bottom two: Quest and Chanon
 Eliminated: Chanon

Episode 9
 Original airdate: Sunday 29 March 2020
 Since Chef Ian Pongthawat Chalermkittichai just came back from work in another country, he decided to lock himself for 14 days to slow down the spread of COVID-19. Instead, he invited Chef Pruek Cassia Samphanthawat to be judge for the week. 
 Mystery Box 4:  Making dessert
 Time: 60 min. (1 hour)
 Three best dishes: Quest, Ploy and Deaw
 Winner: Quest
 Invention Test 4:  Making the assigned menu ice-cream

There are three menus for Quest to choose from, in which she had chosen:

Time: 60 min. (1 hour)

As a result, Lisa did the best, Paope in second.
 Winner: Lisa
 Bottom three: Toei, Gino and Pond 
 Eliminated: Pond

Episode 10
 Original airdate: Sunday 5 April 2020
 Team Challenge 5:  Delivery onilne version, cook for 600 people around Bangkok who support Masterchef Thailand.
 Location: Central World Bangkok 
 Since this is a very challenging challenge in Masterchef history, they have four extra people from the previous eliminations to help both teams. Which includes Pond, Chanon, Jumlong and Lukkate.
{| class="wikitable"
|-
!Team Captain
!Members
|-
|style="background:red;color:white;"|Lisa
| Lat, Jah, Golf, Toei, Deaw and Chanon
|-
| style="background:#0000FF;color:white;"|Paope
| Quest, Ploy, Gino, Bank, Jumlong, Pond and Lukkate
|}
 Time: 2 hours and 30 min. to prepare and deliver, within the first 30 min. for the example.

Score: When the toll ends, there are total of 496 people ordered the dish, in which 203 from the red team and 293 from blue team. But since both teams can't serve all in time, this makes red team served in total of 192 servings, while blue team served 202. That is not the final score though, the judges also have to take off points from the customers who didn't like the food. As a result, red team won blue team with the final score of 130 to 127.
 Winner: Red team

 Pressure Test 5:  Making grilled lamb rib with herb crust, served with cannelloni ricotta cheese pickle and spicy coconut milk moose.
 Guest: Chef Aof
What they want: The lamb steak needs to be medium rare, and herb crust needs to be stick onto the rib. The cannelloni needs to be al-dente, and both ricotta cheese pickle and spicy coconut milk moose needs to taste like the original, in which the moose needs to be set like whipped cream.
 Time: 60 min. (1 hour)
 Eliminated: Gino

Episode 11
TOP 10 All-Stars
 New airdate: Sunday 21 June 2020

This episode is a special clip of judges talking about all 10 contestants' journey through Masterchef challenges. Contestants include Lisa, Ploy, Lat, Deaw, Jah, Bank, Golf, Toei, Quest and Paope.

Episode 12
 This episode was originally scheduled to air on April 12, 2020, but was delayed to a later date due to the COVID-19 pandemic.
 New airdate: Sunday 28 June 2020
Note: This episode has been taken at the end of March, which is close to Songkran Festival, or Thai New Year.

Mystery Box 5: Cook a special dish that is a memory to their family 
 Time: 60 min. (1 hour)
Three best dishes: Lat, Lisa and Deaw
Winner: Deaw

Invention Test 5: Cook a memory dish from the three winners of Masterchef Thailand

In this round, the contestants have to create a higher-level dish from the special guests, which are the three winners of Masterchef Thailand. This includes Kaew from Season 1, First from Season 2, and Max from Season 3. Each person has their own memory dish to have the contestants create today. For Kaew is Spaghetti and Meatballs, First is Khai-Pam, and Max is Choux Cream''. Not just only immune to the next round, Deaw had a chance to choose the three menus that he would like. He chose:

Time: 60 min. (1 hour)
Overall, Bank did the best, Lat in second.
Winner: Bank
Bottom three: Golf, Quest and Toei
Eliminated: Toei

Episode 13
New airdate: Sunday 5 July 2020
From this episode, all tapes will be recorded after the curfew. Meaning, there will be social distancing and sanitizing rules while in the competition.

Black Box Challenge: Creating Italian and Indian cuisine dish.

This week, they will be separated into two groups by Bank, which is the winner of the last Invention test. He choose to have Paope, Jah, Golf and Ploy to be his opponent, so this makes Lat, Lisa, Quest and Deaw in another group. After that, Lat, which ranks second last week, get to choose whether she would like Indian or Italian for her group. She chose Indian, meaning Bank's group has Italian.

Round 1: Italian

Since we're in the spread of COVID-19 situation, each contestant have to make three dishes, one for each judges.
Time: 60 min. (1 hour)
Bottom two: Bank and Ploy
Eliminated: Ploy

Round 2: Indian

Same as the Round 1, each contestant needs to make three dishes, one for each judges because of COVID-19 situation.
Time: 60 min. (1 hour)
Deaw was eliminated, because his roti was undercooked.
Eliminated: Deaw

Episode 14
New airdate: Sunday 12 July 2020

Mystery Box 6: Cook a combination dish of pickled crab, sweet condensed milk, and raw bananas.

For the winner of this round will automatically qualified to Semi-final of Masterchef All-Stars Thailand. And since we're in the spread of COVID-19 pandemic, each contestant have to make three dishes, one for each judges.
Time: 60 min. (1 hour)
Three best dishes: Lisa, Paope and Quest
Winner: Paope

Pressure Test 6: Cook bean sprouts, tofu, minced chicken, and white balsamic sauce stuffed in Xiao Long Bao. 

In this round, all six contestants have to make a signature dish from a chef who works with Chef Ian for over 10 years. She is Chef Ann Pavita, which is also one of the contestant in The Next Iron Chef Thailand. Today Chef Ann brought her own signature dish from bean sprouts, and it is Xiao Long Bao stuffed with bean sprouts, tofu, minced chicken, and white balsamic sauce. In this challenge, two people will be sent home.

Original: 

1. The pastry needs to be thin, and not thick. The Xiao Long Bao have to be folded neatly, and completely covered without any holes or leaks.

2. The filling must clearly raise the bean sprouts, and have the right amount of tofu, chopped chicken and bean sprouts like original.

3. White balsamic sauce needs to have taste like original.

4. When slicing the Xiao Long Bao, the soup of white balsamic sauce needs to be juicy, not dry.

Time: 60 min. (1 hour) for 8 pieces.
Bottom three: Bank, Lisa and Golf
Eliminated: Lisa and Golf

Episode 15: Semi-Final
New airdate: Sunday 19-26 July 2020

Mystery Box 7: Cook a fine-dining dish from ingredients during curfew.

The winner of this mystery box will be the first to qualify to the finale of Masterchef All-Stars Thailand. The rest will have to face the second round.
Time: 60 min (1 hour)
Winner: Paope

Invention Test 6: Main ingredient: Uni

For the winner of this round will be the second to qualify to the finale. The rest will be facing the last round that they cannot predict what will happen.
Time: 60 min (1 hour)
Winner: Jah

Pressure Test 7: Roasted shrimp paste with deep-fried snakehead fish 

In this round, the contestants will have to use their knowledge to identify the ingredients inside the roasted shrimp paste, and yet the judge have put in a mystery ingredient inside the paste. A contestant who did closest to the original will be the third and last to qualify to the finale. Unfortunately, the other two will be sent home.
Time: 60 min (1 hour)

The result was announced on Episode 16 (July 26) within the finale.
Winner: Quest
Eliminated: Lat and Bank

Episode 16-17: Finale
Airdate: Sunday 26 July - 2 August 2020

It has come to the finale round, in which the finalist are Paope, Jah, and Quest. All three of them have to create their three different course which are appetizer, main course, and dessert. The contestant needs to make three dishes, one for each judge. They have 60 minutes (1 hour) on each course, and 10 minutes in the supermarket (this includes all three courses). A contestant with the overall best presentation will be crowned as the next Masterchef, with 1,000,000 baht, and her own cookbook.
Time: 60 min (1 hour) in each course.
 Masterchef All-Stars Thailand Winner: Paope Jessica Wang

References

MasterChef Thailand
2020 Thai television seasons
Television productions suspended due to the COVID-19 pandemic
Thai television series based on British television series